The third season of the reality television show Storage Wars aired on A&E from June 5, 2012 to March 25, 2013. It consisted of 30 episodes, beginning with the episode "Third Eye of the Tiger" and ending with the episode "Still Nobody's Vault But Mine".

All of the episodes this season were filmed at various self-storage facilities throughout Southern California, including Mini-U Storage,  Storage Outlet and Extra Storage.

Episode overview
{|class="wikitable plainrowheaders" style="width:100%; margin:auto; background:#fff;"
|-
!  style="width:10%; background:#39acac; color:#fff;"|No. inseries 
!  style="width:10%; background:#39acac; color:#fff;"|No. inseason 
!  style="width:50%; background:#39acac; color:#fff;"|Title
!  style="width:20%; background:#39acac; color:#fff;"|Location
!  style="width:20%; background:#39acac; color:#fff;"|Original air date
|-

|}

Episode statistics

Round 1

Round 2

Notes In Round 1
 1 Although he did not buy a unit, Barry ended up spending $500 after he bought a set of tools and sirens for an Indian motorcycle from Brandi and Jarrod.
 2 Dave did not attend the main auction in Montebello, but instead purchased a unit in Costa Mesa at a different self-storage facility.
 3 Dave did not attend the main auction in Westminster, but instead purchased a unit in Fontana at a different self-storage facility.
 4 This unit was purchased by Darrell's son Brandon Sheets.
 5 Barry only made $350 on the unit, but he made a further $5,000 on a bet with Dave over the age of a vintage sofa, a bet which Barry won.
 6 Since Dave had a broken axle on his trailer because a wheel came off, the profit of his locker decreased by $500 so he could pay for repairs and pulled Brandi and Jarrod's over as a prank.
 7 Although Barry bought a unit at the auction for $875, he spent another $800 on an antique box and some Halloween decorations that he bought from Brandi and Jarrod as they were going through their unit.

Other Notes
 In "...More, Like WRONG Beach", Mark Balelo did not score a locker.
 In "All's Fair In Storage and Wars", Jeff Jarred spent $2,700 and made a profit of $6,749.
 In "The Fast and The Curious", Jeff Jarred spent $350 and made a profit of $900.
 In "From Russia with Chucks", Jeff Jarred spent $1,050 and lost $420.
 In "The Young and The Reckless", Jeff Jarred spent $2,700 and lost $700.
 In "A Tale Of Two Jackets", Nabila Haniss did not score a locker.
 In "Tustin Bee Have a Problem", Jeff Jarred spent $5 and made a profit of $1,930.
 In "The Big Boys vs. The Heavyweights", Ivy Calvin spent $735 on three lockers and made a profit of $2,225.
 In "The Chief, The Kook, His Son and The Brothers", The Harris Brothers spent $45 and made a profit of $855.
 In "Nobody's Vault But Mine", Herb and Mike spent $400 and made a profit of $790. Mark Balelo spent $1,500 and lost $700.
 In "Still Nobody's Vault But Mine", Ivy Calvin spent $275 and made a profit of $480.

References

External links
 Storage Wars Zap2it Episode List

Season 3